The name Charles Etienne may refer to:
 Charles Estienne (1504–1564), French anatomist
 Charles-Guillaume Étienne (1778–1845), French playwright